Telothyria is a genus of parasitic flies in the family Tachinidae. There are at least 20 described species in Telothyria.

Species
These 20 species belong to the genus Telothyria:

 Telothyria assimulata (Wulp, 1891)
 Telothyria brevipennis (Schiner, 1868)
 Telothyria comata (Wulp, 1890)
 Telothyria costalis (Wulp, 1890)
 Telothyria cupreiventris Wulp, 1890
 Telothyria disgrega (Wulp, 1890)
 Telothyria fasciata (Wulp, 1890)
 Telothyria fimbricura (Wulp, 1890)
 Telothyria forticula (Wulp, 1890)
 Telothyria hamata (Wulp, 1890)
 Telothyria illucens Wulp, 1890
 Telothyria lugens (Wulp, 1890)
 Telothyria pacata (Wulp, 1890)
 Telothyria placida Wulp, 1890
 Telothyria recondita (Wulp, 1890)
 Telothyria relicta Wulp, 1890
 Telothyria rufostriata Wulp, 1890
 Telothyria thecata
 Telothyria trifurca (Wulp, 1890)
 Telothyria vicina (Wulp, 1890)

References

Further reading

 
 
 
 

Dexiinae
Articles created by Qbugbot